Standing in the Line of Fire is an album by Gary U.S. Bonds, released in 1984. It is credited to Gary U.S. Bonds and the American Men. The album was a followup to his two Springsteen/Van Zandt-produced albums Dedication and On the Line, though the only carry-over from the previous two albums was Steven Van Zandt, who wrote, sang backing vocals for, and played lead guitar on the title track.

The album contains a cover of Ritchie Valens's "Come On Let's Go." The title track was released as a single paired with "Wild Nights," but received little attention. The album remains unissued on CD.

Track listing
All songs written by Gary U.S. Bonds unless otherwise noted.

 "Standing In the Line of Fire" (Steven Van Zandt) - 3:39
 "Sneakin' Away" - 3:19
 "I Wish I Could Dance Like Fred Astaire" - 3:15
 "Working Man" - 4:08
 "Wild Nights" - 3:52
 "Dance" - 3:41
 "Take a Chance" - 3:39
 "City Lights" - 3:31
 "Come On Let's Go" (Ritchie Valens) - 2:27
 "You Are the One" - 5:03

Personnel
Musicians:
 Gary U.S. Bonds - lead vocals
 Steven Van Zandt - guitar (lead "Standing In the Line of Fire"), background vocals ("Standing In the Line of Fire")
 The American Men:
 Joe Martin - guitar, background vocals
 Lucille Almond - guitar, background vocals
 Rudy Richman - drums, background vocals
 Steve Rossi - keyboards, background vocals
 Joey Stann - saxophone, horns, background vocals
 Larry Russell - bass, background vocals
 U.S. Horns:
 Nelson Bogart
 Mark Pender
 Ed Manion
 Bob Funk
 Joey Stann
 Additional musicians:
 Phil 'Teddy Bear' Grande - guitar
 Gregg Meade - guitar, background vocals
 Bob Cadway - guitar
 Dean Bailin - guitar
 Mike Macara - drums
 Nicky Bear - keyboards
 Frankie Vinci - keyboards, background vocals
 Gene Kraus - keyboards
 Alan Palanka - keyboards
 George Ruiz - bass, background vocals
 Gary Watkins - bass
 Donna Cristy - background vocals
 Donna Bach - background vocals
 Avita Belmonte - background vocals

Production:
 Gary U.S. Bonds - producer, mixing
 Steven Van Zandt - producer (track 1), mixing
 Billy Civitella - producer (tracks 2-5), mixing
 John Apostol - executive producer
 John Devlin - mixing
 Tom Coyne - mastering
 Dino Danelli - art direction, design
 Jim Marchesi - photography

References

1984 albums
Gary U.S. Bonds albums
Albums produced by Steven Van Zandt
Phoenix Records albums